Hunan Cultural Revolution Massacre may refer to any of the massacres in Hunan Province, China during the Chinese Cultural Revolution (1966-1976): 
 
 Daoxian Massacre, in which more than 9,000 people died from August to October in 1967.
 Shaoyang County Massacre, in which 991 people died from July to September in 1968 (some scholars have pointed out that thousands of people died in reality).